Wachter is a noble surname of German origin, sometimes romanized as Waechter. Its variant forms include Wächter, Wachtler and  Wächtler.

People with the surname 
Alfred von Kiderlen-Waechter (1852–1912), German nobleman, diplomat and politician, who served as Secretary of State and head of the Foreign Office, best known for his role in the Agadir Crisis in 1911
 Anita Wachter (born 1967), Austrian professional alpine skier
 Charles Wachter (1865–1928), German-born businessman and city commissioner in Bismarck, North Dakota
 Ed Wachter (1883–1966), professional basketball player
 Frank Charles Wachter (1861–1910), American  politician and Congressman from Maryland
 Graziella Marok-Wachter (born 1965), Liechtenstein politician
 Harry W. Wachter (1868–1941), a Toledo, Ohio architect
 Marcia De Wachter (born 1953), Belgian  businesswoman and Director of the National Bank of Belgium
 Matt Wachter (born 1976), American bassist 
 Michael Wachter (born 1943), American professor at the University of Pennsylvania Law School

See also
 Wächter
 Wächtler
 Wachtler
 Wachtel

German-language surnames
Occupational surnames